Military districts (also called military regions) are formations of a state's armed forces (often of the Army) which are responsible for a certain area of territory. They are often more responsible for administrative than operational matters, and in countries with conscript forces, often handle parts of the conscription cycle.

Navies have also used a similar model, with organizations such as the United States Naval Districts. A number of navies in South America used naval districts at various points in time.

Algeria

Algeria is divided into six numbered military regions, each with headquarters located in a principal city or town (see People's National Army (Algeria)#Military regions). This system of territorial organization, adopted shortly after independence, grew out of the wartime wilaya structure and the postwar necessity of subduing antigovernment insurgencies that were based in the various regions. Regional commanders control and administer bases, logistics, and housing, as well as conscript training. Commanders of army divisions and brigades, air force installations, and naval forces report directly to the Ministry of National Defence and service chiefs of staff on operational matters. Previously Algeria had formed France's tenth military region.

Military region commanders in 2003 included Brahim Fodel Chérif (1st Military Region), Kamel Abderrahmane (2nd Military Region, Abcène Tafer (3rd Military Region), Abdelmadjid Sahed (4th Military Region, Chérif Abderrazak (5th Military Region) and Ali Benali (6th Military Region).

China

Republic of China

There were 76 northern military districts or military regions (軍區), or war areas, which were the largest formations of the National Revolutionary Army, under the Military Affairs Commission, chaired by Chiang Kai-shek during the Second Sino-Japanese War and World War II. During the Second Sino-Japanese War the National Revolutionary Army eventually organized itself into twelve Military Regions.

People's Republic of China

The military regions (originally eleven, then seven) of the People's Liberation Army were divided into military districts (usually contiguous with provinces) and military sub-districts, under the command of the Central Military Commission.

In February 2016, the 7 military regions were changed to 5 theater commands:

 Eastern Theater Command
 Southern Theater Command
 Western Theater Command
 Northern Theater Command
 Central Theater Command

France

Third Republic
Under the Third Republic, a military region comprised several departments which supported an army corps. For many years up to 21 military regions were active.

Fifth Republic
With the evolution of administrative organization, France was divided into regional administrative districts (circa 1963) (administrative region dependent of a prefect of the region). The military organisation then combined the administrative organization and in each CAR corresponded a territorial military division (TMD). On the defence side, these military divisions have been grouped into military regions. Their number varied depending on the period. The current number is six.

Germany

German Reich

Before and during World War II, Germany used the system of military districts to relieve field commanders of as much administrative work as possible and to provide a regular flow of trained recruits and supplies to the Field Army. The method they adopted was to separate the Field Army  (Oberbefehlshaber des Heeres) from the Home Command (Heimatkriegsgebiet) and to entrust the responsibilities of training, conscription, supply and equipment to that command.

The Commander of the Infantry Corps with the identical number also commanded the Wehrkreis in peacetime, but command of the Wehrkreis passed to his second-in command at the outbreak of war.

In peacetime, the Wehrkreis was the home to the Infantry Corps of the same number and all subordinate units of that Corps.

Federal Republic of Germany

Until 2013  the German Armed Forces (Bundeswehr) had four military districts – Wehrbereichskommando (WBK) as part of the Streitkräftebasis or Joint Service Support Command. Each WBK controlled several Landeskommandos (State Commands) due to the federal structure of Germany who have taken over functions carried out by the Verteidigungsbezirkskommandos (VBKs) or Military Region Commands (Defence District Commands) as. These command authorities are in charge of all military facilities. Now the Landeskommmandos are led by the National Territorial Command called Kommando Territoriale Aufgaben der Bundeswehr (KdoTerrAufgBw).

Indonesia

The Indonesian Army (Bahasa Indonesia: Tentara Nasional Indonesia - Angkatan Darat "TNI-AD") uses military districts, known as Komando Daerah Militer (Military Region command) or KODAM. It was created by General Soedirman as a system initially called "Wehrkreise", adapted from the German system during World War II. The system was later ratified in "Surat Perintah Siasat No.1" (No.1 Strategy Command Letter), signed in November 1948.

Military regional commands functioned as a means of circles of defense, or regional defense, to defend the designated islands/provinces under Indonesian territory. Each MRC commander had full authority to begin operations with assets available in the district. MRC commanders have command and  autonomy over its military structures and organizations.

Kazakhstan

The Kazakh Ground Forces 
are divided into four regional commands:

Regional Command "Astana" headquartered in Nur-Sultan
Regional Command "East" headquartered in Semey
Regional Command "West" headquartered in Atyrau
Regional Command "South" headquartered in Taraz

Poland

Initially, right after the First World War, Poland had five military districts (1918–1921):
 Kraków Military District (Krakowski Okręg Wojskowy), HQ in Kraków
 Łódź Military District (Łódzki Okręg Wojskowy), HQ in Łódź
 Lublin Military District (Lubelski Okręg Wojskowy), HQ in Lublin.
 Poznań Military District (Poznański Okręg Wojskowy), HQ in Poznań
 Warsaw Military District (Warszawski Okręg Wojskowy), HQ in Warszawa.

In 1921, due to reorganization, the military districts were replaced with Dowództwo Okręgu Korpusu (DOK – Corps District Command). In the Second Polish Republic there were ten DOKs: 
 I – Warszawa
 II – Lublin
 III – Grodno
 IV – Łódź
 V – Kraków
 VI – Lwów
 VII – Poznań
 VIII – Toruń
 IX – Brześć nad Bugiem
 X – Przemyśl

Each DOK consisted of four large units (three infantry divisions and one cavalry brigade).

For district arrangements after World War II see Polish Land Forces. The Kraków Military District disbanded in 1953. From 1999 Poland has been divided into two military districts, the Pomeranian Military District and the Silesian Military District, both were disbanded by the end of 2011.

Russia and the Soviet Union

Russian Empire

The Russian Empire's military district (voyenny okrug) was a territorial association of military units, formations, military schools, and various local military establishments.  This territorial division type was utilized in Imperial Russia, USSR and is currently in use in Russian Federation.

Such territorial division provided convenient management of army units, their training and other activities regarding the country's readiness to defend itself.

Soviet Union

In the USSR, the military districts continued to perform the same role they had done in the Russian Empire, with first six military districts (Yaroslavsky, Moskovsky, Orlovsky, Belomorsky, Uralsky, and Privolzhsky) were formed on 31 March 1918 during the Russian Civil War.

This increased to 17 military districts of the USSR at the beginning of July 1940 shortly before the USSR was invaded by Germany and entered the Second World War, and were used to create combat Fronts after commencement of the German invasion of the USSR.

During the war the districts were further divided into geographic regions for logistic reasons, these being:

North and North Western districts
West and Central USSR districts
South and South Western districts
Siberian and Central Asian districts
Far Eastern districts

After the war, the number was increased to 33 to aid in demobilisation of forces, but by October 1946, they had been reduced to 21.

By the end of the 1980s, immediately before the dissolution of the Soviet Union, there were sixteen military districts, within three to five main strategic Theatre groupings.

Russian Federation

A military district (voyenny okrug) in the Russian Federation operates under the command of the district headquarters, headed by the district commander, and is subordinated to the General Staff of the Armed Forces of the Russian Federation. (Previously under Commander-in-Chief of the Ground Forces General Nikolai Kormiltsev, the military districts reported to the General Staff via the Russian Ground Forces staff.) It is a territorial association of military units, formations, military schools, and various local military establishments. This territorial division type was historically adopted, originally by Imperial Russia, to provide a more efficient management of army units, their training and other operations activities related to combat readiness.

From 1992 to 2010, the Armed Forces maintained a diminishing number of former Soviet Armed Forces districts – Leningrad Military District, Moscow Military District, Volga-Urals Military District, North Caucasus Military District, Siberian Military District, Far East Military District.

In 2009–2010, these districts were reorganised into 4 Military Districts comprising regional Joint Strategic Commands:
In 2014 Northern Fleet was reorganized into separate Joint Strategic Command.
Western Military District with headquarters in Saint Petersburg
Southern Military District with headquarters in Rostov-on-Don
Central Military District with headquarters in Ekaterinburg
Eastern Military District with headquarters in Khabarovsk
Northern Fleet with headquarters in Severomorsk

Sweden

The military district (usually abbreviated to Milo) was an administrative division of the Swedish Armed Forces, and was a higher regional level subdivision. The commander of a military district, the Militärområdesbefälhavare (also militärbefälhavare), commanded the Swedish Army divisions stationed in the region, the regional naval command, the regional air defence sector as well as the lower regional level subdivision defence districts that made up the military district. The commander answered directly to the Supreme Commander. The military districts in the modern form were created in 1966, and each district was named according to the geographical area they covered. Several changes were made, such as creating or merging districts, until all military districts were disbanded in 2000. After the Defence Act of 2000 the military districts were replaced by new military districts (usually abbreviated to MD). The new military districts corresponded geographically to the former military districts, however, they did not have the same territorial and operational tasks. In 2005, the military districts were replaced to some extent by four Security and Cooperation Sections.

United Kingdom

British Army regional districts have evolved slowly over the previous 150 years or so. For many years there were regional commands in the UK, including Aldershot Command (from 1880), Eastern Command, Northern Command, Scottish Command, Southern Command and Western Command (from 1905). By 1985 these were superseded by districts, and until the spring of 1991 there were nine of them. Antony Beevor wrote in his revised edition of Inside the British Army in 1991 that '..the first of the minor districts to be amalgamated were North West District, Western District, and Wales, to form a new Western District.' HQ Northern Ireland remained separate and reported to HQ UK Land Forces only on non-operational matters.

From 1995, UK commands and later districts were replaced by regenerative divisions. 2nd Division, 4th Division, 5th Division and London District acted as regional commands within the UK reporting to Commander Regional Forces. Scotland District was absorbed by 2nd Division in 2000. The divisions were responsible for training subordinate formations and units under their command for operations in the UK, such as Military Aid to the Civil Community, as well as training units for overseas deployments. 2nd, 4th and 5th Divisions were replaced by Support Command on 1 November 2011.

United States

The military department was a military and administrative command of the US Army.

Present day US military organization is structured around Unified Combatant Commands, which encompass different geographical areas and responsibilities.

Uzbekistan 

Military districts of the Armed Forces of Uzbekistan are under the jurisdiction of the defense ministry of the republic. In May 2001, the Tashkent Garrison was transformed into the Tashkent Military District. The following are a list of military districts in Uzbekistan:

Northwest Military District (HQ Nukus)
Southwest Special Military District (HQ Qarshi)
Central Military District (HQ Dzhizak)
Eastern Military District (HQ Ferghana)
Tashkent Military District (HQ Tashkent)

The replenishment of the ranks of divisions and units in wartime is done by order of the commanders of military districts.

Vietnam
Vietnam People's Army has 8 Military Regions:
 Hanoi Capital Command: It is directly under the Ministry of Defense of Vietnam; tasked to organize, build, manage and command armed forces defending the capital. The headquarters is in Hanoi.
 1st Military Region: It is directly under the Ministry of Defense of Vietnam; tasked to protect against foreign invaders; and to organize, build, manage and command forces in northeastern Vietnam. The headquarters is in Thai Nguyen.
 2nd Military Region: It is directly under the Ministry of Defense of Vietnam; tasked to organize, build, manage and command armed forces defending northwestern Vietnam. The headquarters is in Viet Tri.
 3rd Military Region: It is directly under the Ministry of Defense of Vietnam; tasked to organize, build, manage and command armed forces defending the Red River Delta area. The headquarters is in Hai Phong.
 4th Military Region: It is directly under the Ministry of Defense of Vietnam; tasked to organize, build, manage and command armed forces defending north central Vietnam. The headquarters is in Vinh.
 5th Military Region: It is directly under the Ministry of Defense of Vietnam; tasked to organize, build, manage and command armed forces defending south central Vietnam, including the western highlands and south central coastal provinces. The headquarters is in Da Nang.
 7th Military Region: It is directly under the Ministry of Defense of Vietnam; tasked to organize, build, manage and command armed forces defending southeastern Vietnam. The headquarters is in Ho Chi Minh City.
 9th Military Region: It is directly under the Ministry of Defense of Vietnam; tasked to organize, build, manage and command armed forces defending the Mekong Delta. The headquarters is in Cần Thơ

The Army of the Republic of Vietnam originally had four corps, for example I Corps (South Vietnam). Later they were redesignated Military Regions 1–4.

See also
Unified Combatant Command
United States historical military districts
Fortified district

References

 
Military units and formations
Military units and formations of China
Military units and formations of Germany
Military units and formations of Indonesia
Types of administrative division